Tony Allan (born in Pukekohe, Auckland Region) is a New Zealand jockey

He started his apprenticeship at age 16 to Grant Searle in Levin.  He said he was inspired to become a jockey by his late father who would frequently take him to the Levin racecourse.

He is best known for riding Empire Rose to victory in the 1988 Melbourne Cup.

Over the course of his racing career Tony accomplished 12 Group 1 wins.

Notable wins

The following are some of the major races Tony has won in his career.

Career

In 2003, Allan admitted to using methamphetamine. However, he has subsequently worked hard to change his lifestyle and become clean. Tony retired in 2005 and moved to Japan for a break, riding trackwork for around 10 years in Hokkaido before a job with Sydney trainers Peter and Paul Snowden. On 27 May 2017 Tony made a comeback to race day riding in New Zealand.

His first winner back in New Zealand was on Thursday 28 June 2017 at Waverley on My Cool Boy.  On Friday 16 March 2018 Tony rode his 1000th winner on New Zealand soil in the opening race at Te Aroha aboard Aigne.

In 2019 it was announced that Tony would head to Queensland to continue his riding career comeback for New Zealand trainer Paddy Busuttin, who was also to come out of retirement to train at Deagon, near Eagle Farm. Tony stated he had previously won "a couple at Eagle Farm and running third on Finezza Belle for Laurie Laxon in a Group Two (Prime Minister’s Cup, 2400m) at the Gold Coast ... I also ran second on Sapio in the Brisbane Cup (Gr. 1, 3200m) and I rode Poetic Prince when he ran second to Planet Ruler in the Queensland Guineas (Gr.2, 1600m)".

In December 2019 Tony came back to New Zealand and resumed Raceday riding.

In 2021 Tony commenced as a horse trainer at Otaki.

See also

 Thoroughbred racing in New Zealand

References

Living people
New Zealand jockeys
New Zealand racehorse trainers 
Sportspeople from Auckland
Year of birth missing (living people)